Olga Lindo (13 July 1899 – 7 May 1968) was an English actress. She was the daughter of Frank Lindo, a well-known actor, manager and author. She made her stage debut at the Theatre Royal, Drury Lane on 26 December 1913. She later joined her father's touring company in a range of roles. For Basil Dean she appeared in R.U.R in 1923, and in 1925 she gave what The Times described as a formidable performance as Sadie Thompson in Maugham's Rain at the Garrick Theatre.  She toured in South Africa in 1930 and 1934 in a variety of parts. Her repertoire ranged from the classics to farce. In 1935 she played Abigail Hill in Norman Ginsbury's historical work Viceroy Sarah. She also acted in films.

Partial filmography

 The Shadow Between (1931) - Nell Baker
 Royal Cavalcade (1935) - Tourist
 The Case of Gabriel Perry (1935) - Mrs. Perry
 Dark World (1935) - Eleanor
 The Last Journey (1936) - Mrs. Holt
 A Romance in Flanders (1937) - Madame Vlandermaere
  What Men Live By (1938, Short) - Martha
 Luck of the Navy (1938) - Mrs. Rance
 The Stars Look Down (1939) - Mrs. Sunley
 Return to Yesterday (1940) - Grace Sambourne
 Alibi (1942) - Mlle. Loureau
 When We Are Married (1943) - Maria Helliwell
 Time Flies (1944) - Queen Elizabeth
 Give Me the Stars (1945) - Lady Hester
 The Rake's Progress (1945) - Woman in Palais de Danse (uncredited)
 Night Boat to Dublin (1946) - Mrs. Coleman
 I See a Dark Stranger (1946) - Mrs. Edwards
 Bedelia (1946) - Mrs. Bennett
 The Phantom Shot (1947) - Mrs. Robson
 Things Happen at Night (1947) - Hilda Prescott
 Obsession (1949) - Mrs. Humphries
 Train of Events (1949) - Mrs. Bailey (segment "The Prisoner-of-War")
 The Twenty Questions Murder Mystery (1950) - Olive Tavey
 An Inspector Calls (1954) - Mrs. Birling
 Raising a Riot (1955) - Aunt Maud
 Yield to the Night (1956) - Hill
 The Extra Day (1956) - Mrs. Bliss
 Woman in a Dressing Gown (1957) - Manageress
 Make Mine a Million (1959) - Mrs. Burgess
 Sapphire (1959) - Mrs. Harris
 Persuasion (1960-1961, TV Mini-Series) - Mrs. Musgrove
 Out of the Fog (1962) - Mrs. Mallon
 Dr Crippen (1962) - Mrs Arditti

Radio 

 The Dark Tower (1946)

References

External links

1899 births
1968 deaths
English film actresses
Place of birth missing
Jewish British actresses
20th-century British actresses
20th-century English women
20th-century English people